Neotridactylus is a genus of pygmy mole crickets in the family Tridactylidae, recorded from the Americas. There are about 16 described species in Neotridactylus.

Species
These 16 species belong to the genus Neotridactylus:

 Neotridactylus achavali Günther, 1972
 Neotridactylus albidus Günther, 1976
 Neotridactylus apicialis (Say, 1825) (larger pygmy mole cricket)
 Neotridactylus archboldi Deyrup & Eisner, 1996 (archbold pygmy mole cricket)
 Neotridactylus australis (Bruner, 1916)
 Neotridactylus cantralli Günther, 1976
 Neotridactylus carbonelli Günther, 1972 - type species
 Neotridactylus obscurus (Bruner, 1916)
 Neotridactylus obsoletus Günther, 1976
 Neotridactylus occultus Günther, 1976
 Neotridactylus parvilamellatus Günther, 1976
 Neotridactylus pentacuminatus Günther, 1989
 Neotridactylus politus (Bruner, 1916)
 Neotridactylus punctulatus Günther, 1976
 Neotridactylus rentzi Günther, 1976
 Neotridactylus spinosus Günther, 1974

References

Further reading

External links

 

Tridactylidae
Articles created by Qbugbot